Ologamasus microcrinis is a species of mite in the family Ologamasidae.

This species was formerly a member of the genus Hydrogamasellus.

References

Ologamasidae
Articles created by Qbugbot
Animals described in 1979